Shawnee Mission USD 512 is a public unified school district headquartered in Shawnee Mission, Kansas, United States.  As of 2018, the district comprises five high schools, five middle schools, 34 elementary schools, and six instructional centers.  There were 27,648 students enrolled during the 2017–2018 school year.

History
In 1969, several school districts unified to become the Shawnee Mission School District.  These districts were Greenwood District 39, Shawnee District 22, Lenexa District 500, Districts 10 and 90, Valley View District 49, Overland Park District 10, Linwood District 1, Roeland District 92, Merriam District 99, Antioch District 61, Westwood View District 93, Prairie District 44, and Corinth District 82.

South Park Elementary school, in Merriam, Kansas, played a role in school desegregation before the unification of the Shawnee Mission School District. South Park opened in 1948 for white students, leaving African-American students in the inadequate Walker Elementary using an outdated curriculum. Corinthian Nutter, an African-American teacher, resigned in protest and taught the students from her home. In 1949, the Webb vs. School District 90 case paved the way for Brown v. Topeka Board of Education five years later.

Skyline Elementary School was presumed to have been named for the fact that one could see the Kansas City, Mo., the skyline from the area around the school.

McAuliffe Elementary School in Lenexa, Kansas, was one of the first schools in the nation named in honor of Christa McAuliffe.

The district converted from the 7–8–9 junior high model to the 7–8 middle school model in 1986.

In 2017, Kenny Southwick was named interim superintendent after Jim Hinson retired.  Hinson had served as superintendent since 2013.

Shawnee Mission North High School

Shawnee Mission Rural High School opened September 12, 1922, having cost $950,000 to build. It had 12 faculty members and a senior class of 20. The school colors are Red, Black, and White, and the school mascot is the Indian. The average annual enrollment is approximately 2,000 students. Shawnee Mission North was formerly known as the Original Shawnee Mission High School.

There had been a vote on September 21, 1921, on a "proposal to organize a rural high school district." The school was named ' Shawnee Mission Rural until 1945 when senior Robert F. Bennett was sent to Topeka to petition the legislature for a name change to more accurately reflect the school's suburban status. Later elected Governor of Kansas, Bennett was named North's first Distinguished Alumnus by the class of 1975. It was thus named Shawnee Mission High School until 1958 when Shawnee Mission East High School opened and Shawnee Mission High School was renamed Shawnee Mission North High School. The student body of Shawnee Mission High School had petitioned the school board to name the new school anything other than Shawnee Mission East High School in an attempt to avoid a renaming of their school.

Feeder schools
 Middle schools
 Hocker Grove Middle School
 Elementary schools
 Bluejacket-Flint Elementary School
 Crestview Elementary School
 East Antioch Elementary School
 Merriam Park Elementary School
 Nieman Elementary School
 Santa Fe Trail Elementary School
 Roesland Elementary School
 Rushton Elementary School

Shawnee Mission East High School

Shawnee Mission East High School opened in 1958. As of 2015, enrollment was 1,642, making it the second-largest school in the Shawnee Mission School District. The mascot is the Lancer and the colors are Columbia blue, black, and white.

Shawnee Mission East is at the southwest corner of 75th Street and Mission Road in the city of Prairie Village, and serves Prairie Village along with the other Kansas suburbs Westwood, Westwood Hills, Mission Hills, Mission Woods, Fairway, Leawood, and Overland Park.

Feeder schools
 Middle Schools
 Indian Hills Middle School
 Elementary Schools
 Belinder Elementary School
 Briarwood Elementary School
 Comanche Elementary School
 Corinth Elementary School
 Highlands Elementary School
 Prairie Elementary School
 Tomahawk Elementary School
 Westwood View Elementary School
 Trailwood Elementary School

Shawnee Mission South High School

Shawnee Mission South's school colors are green and gold and its mascot is the Raider. The school's mascot was chosen by the first graduating class of 1967. The Raider was chosen as a mascot because of the popular band Paul Revere and the Raiders. Juniors from Shawnee Mission East and Shawnee Mission West were assigned to Shawnee Mission South the first year the school opened. Most of the students from the South come from the middle school Indian Woods. The school's population in 2006 was 1,805 students, down from a peak of around 2,400 in 1975.
South has a newspaper called the Patriot and a yearbook called Heritage.

Feeder schools
 Middle Schools
 Indian Woods Middle School (formerly Nallwood Junior High School)
 Elementary Schools
 Brookridge Elementary School
 Brookwood Elementary School
 John Diemer Elementary School
 Oak Park-Carpenter Elementary School
 Rosehill Elementary School
 Trailwood Elementary School

Shawnee Mission West High School

Shawnee Mission West's mascot is the Viking and the official school colors are black and gold. West opened its doors in 1962; since then, it has been remodeled several times. Additions have also been made to the school, the most famous of which is "the bridge," an actual bridge between halves of the school that later had classrooms added beneath it. As of 2006, the school had 2,042 students.  It is in Overland Park at 85th Street and Antioch Road.

The former principal, Karl Krawitz, was the NEA III District Educator of the Year for 2004–2005.

West is home to both an award-winning school newspaper, the Epic, and a yearbook, SAGA. The Epic was ranked the fifth-best news magazine in the country by the Scholastic Press Association in 2010. West has twice (1986 and 2007) placed second at the National Forensic League tournament for policy debate.

West's student body population is 10 percent African American, which is the highest African American population of any Shawnee Mission high school.  West is the most ethnically diverse high school in the district.  West draws its student population from Overland Park, Lenexa, and small parts of Shawnee.

Feeder schools
 Middle Schools
 Westridge Middle School (formerly Hillcrest Junior High School)
 Elementary Schools
 Apache Elementary School
 Christa McAuliffe Elementary School (Partial)
 Comanche Elementary School
 East Antioch Elementary School (Partial)
 Lenexa Hills Elementary School (Opening Fall of 2018)
 Overland Park Elementary School
 Pawnee Elementary School
 Rising Star Elementary School (Partial)
 Sunflower Elementary School (Partial)

Shawnee Mission Northwest High School

Shawnee Mission Northwest High School's mascot is the Cougar, and the school colors are black and orange. Its principal is Lisa Gruman. As of the 2005–2006 school year, Northwest had 1,859 students. It is in Shawnee, at 12701 West 67th Street, between Pflumm Road and Quivira Road.

Feeder schools
 Middle Schools
 Trailridge Middle School (formerly Trailridge Junior High School)
 Elementary Schools
 Broken Arrow Elementary School
 Christa McAuliffe Elementary School (Partial)
 Mill Creek Elementary School
 Raymond B. Marsh Elementary School (Ray Marsh)
 Rhein Benninghoven Elementary School
 Rising Star Elementary School (Partial)
 Shawanoe Elementary School
 Sunflower Elementary School (Partial)

District centers
 McEachen Administrative Center
 Arrowhead Administrative Center
 Horizons High School
 Broadmoor Technical Center
 Indian Creek Technical Center
 SM Instructional Support Center

Former schools
 Middle/Junior High Schools
 Antioch Middle School (formerly Milburn Junior High School)
 Broadmoor Junior High School 
 Indian Creek Junior High School (now Indian Creek Technical Center)
 Mission Valley Middle School (formerly Meadowbrook Junior High School)
 Old Mission Junior High School (closed in 1986)
 Elementary Schools
 Antioch Elementary School (now part of the Shawnee Mission Medical Center in Merriam, KS)
 Arrowhead Elementary School (now Arrowhead Administrative Center)
 Cherokee Elementary School (now New Haven Seventh Day Adventist Church)
 Don Bonjour Elementary School (now Shawnee Mission Unitarian Universalist Church)
 Dorothy Moody Elementary School (closed at end of 2011–2012 school year)
 Flint Elementary School (merged with Bluejacket to become Bluejacket-Flint Elementary School)
 Greenwood Elementary School (razed, now a Walmart Supermarket)
 Hickory Grove Elementary School (now Horizons High School)
 Katherine Carpenter Elementary School (merged with Oak Park to become Oak Park-Carpenter Elementary School) (Now SM Instructional Support Center)
 Linwood Elementary School
 Marsha Bagby Elementary School
 Mohawk Elementary School (now Mohawk Park)
 Nall Hills Elementary School
 Osage Elementary School (now Osage Park)
 Porter Elementary School (now Porter Park)
 Ridgeview Elementary School (now Kansas City Christian School)
 Roeland Park Elementary School (closed in 2003)
 Sequoyah Elementary School (now Vineyard Community Church)
 Shawnee Elementary School
 Skyline Elementary School
 Somerset Elementary School
 South Park Elementary School (merged with Merriam to become Merriam Park Elementary School)
 Valley View Elementary School (now Holy Cross Catholic School)
 West Antioch Elementary School (closed in 2003)

Demographics
As of the census of 2000, the district had a population of 219,949 with 93,221 households (or occupied housing units) and 59,084 families. 69.0 percent of the housing units were occupied by the owner. The racial makeup of the district was 91.0 percent White, 2.6 percent Black or African American, 0.3 percent American Indian and Alaska Native, 2.8 percent Asian, less than 0.1 percent Native Hawaiian and other Pacific Islander, 1.6 percent of some other race, and 1.6 percent of two or more races. 4.3 percent of the population was Hispanic or Latino.

There were 93,221 households, of which 29.9 percent were people living alone, 63.4 percent were families, and 6.7 percent were non-families with two or more people. 52.2 percent of households (or 82.4 percent of families) were married couples living together and 28.6 percent (or 45.1 percent) had their own children (persons under the age of 18) living with them. Of the 11.2 percent of households that had a householder with no spouse present, 44.4 percent were women living with their own children. The average household size was 2.33, and the average family size was 2.93.

The 50,632 children in the district were 23.0 percent of the total population, and 13,283 (6.0 percent) were under the age of 5; 13,605 (6.2 percent) were from 5 to 9; 14,874 (6.8 percent) were from 10 to 14; and 8,870 (4.0 percent) were from 15 to 17. 48.8 percent of the children were female. For 95.1 percent of the children in the district, the householder was the child's parent and 77.3 percent live in married-couple families, but 1.1 percent were not related to the householder. 21 householders or spouses were under the age of 18.

District Superintendents
On February 12, 2018, the Shawnee Mission Board of Education named Dr. Michael Fulton as the new Superintendent.

See also
 Kansas State Department of Education
 Kansas State High School Activities Association
 List of high schools in Kansas
 List of unified school districts in Kansas

References

External links
 
 Summary of the school district from the Kansas State Department of Education website]
 School Closing History
 Myers Reports on Military to Oldest Friends, a September 2005 article about the return of General Richard Myers to Shawnee Mission North

Education in Johnson County, Kansas
Kansas City metropolitan area
School districts in Kansas
1969 establishments in Kansas
School districts established in 1969